Francesco Costanzo Catanio, (1602 – July 3, 1665) was a painter of the Italian Baroque period, born and mainly active in Ferrara. He was variously known as Catanio, Cattani, Cattaneo, or Cattanio, sometimes without the forename Francesco.

Life 

Catanio was born in 1602 in Ferrara, at that time in the Papal States, now in Emilia-Romagna, the son of Giulio Cesare Catanio. He initially trained under  Ippolito Scarsellino in Ferrara, until – because of his "...litigious and ill-tempered..." manner – his father sent him to Bologna to study in the school of Guido Reni. On the death of his father in 1627, he returned to Ferrara, where he came under the influence of Carlo Bononi, and began to paint in a style less influenced by Ludovico Carracci and more by Caravaggio.

Catanio was described as prone to carrying a sword, hunting, and brawls.  He was so quarrelsome and had such a turbulent disposition that he passed the greater portion of his life in exile or in disgrace.  After injuring a soldier, Catanio was forced to seek refuge in the monastery of San Francesco where he was employed in painting frescoes.  He was able to travel with the Marchese Giraldi throughout Italy.  In 1654, he traveled briefly to Rome in the patronage of Cardinal Carlo Pio di Savoia.

Works 

One source says he excelled in painting scenes of soldiers and ruffians in combat.

In his earliest works in Ferrara – a San Gregorio originally painted soon after 1630 for the church of that saint, now in Santa Maria dei Teatini, and the Coronazione di spine and Flagellazione in the Duomo from before 1636 – already show the influence of Caravaggio. He also painted studio portraits. 

References

Further reading 

1602 births
1665 deaths
17th-century Italian painters
Italian male painters
Painters from Ferrara
Italian Baroque painters